Microbiota is a monotypic genus of evergreen coniferous shrubs in the cypress family Cupressaceae, containing only one species, Microbiota decussata (Siberian carpet cypress, Russian arbor-vitae). The plant is native and endemic to a limited area of the Sikhote-Alin mountains in Primorskiy Krai in the Russian Far East. Microbiota is not to be confused with the range of microorganisms of the same name. The genus name was derived from micro-, meaning "small", + Biota, the genus name for a closely related conifer, a species formerly called Biota orientalis, now renamed Platycladus orientalis.

Description

The foliage forms flat sprays with scale-like leaves 2–4 mm long. The cones are among the smallest of any conifer, 2–3 mm long, green ripening brown in about eight months from pollination, and have four scales arranged in two opposite pairs. The seeds are 2 mm long, with no wing; there is usually only one seed in each cone, rarely two. The foliage sometimes turns brown in winter, giving the impression that the plant has died; but it revives in spring.

Taxonomy
The monotypic taxon Microbiota was discovered in 1923, but political secrecy in the former Soviet Union prevented any knowledge of its existence outside the country for around 50 years.

Microbiota is generally accepted as being a distinct genus. It has also been suggested, but not widely followed, that Microbiota could be included in the closely related genus Platycladus. Other fairly close relatives are the genera Juniperus and Cupressus.

Cultivation
Microbiota decussata is grown as an ornamental plant for use as evergreen groundcover in gardens and parks. It is valued for its drought tolerance and considerable cold temperature and winter season conditions tolerance. It has gained the Royal Horticultural Society's Award of Garden Merit.

References

External links

 Arboretum de Villardebelle - Microbiota leaf and cone photos
 Gymnosperm Database - Microbiota decussata
 Conifers Around the World: Microbiota decussata - Cypress-Juniper.

Cupressaceae
Endemic flora of Russia
Primorsky Krai
Least concern plants
Garden plants of Asia
Drought-tolerant plants
Groundcovers